Ha Jong-ho (born 16 July 1963) is a South Korean boxer. He competed in the men's middleweight event at the 1988 Summer Olympics.

References

External links
 

1963 births
Living people
South Korean male boxers
Olympic boxers of South Korea
Boxers at the 1988 Summer Olympics
Place of birth missing (living people)
Middleweight boxers